The Volca Keys is a subtractive analogue synthesizer manufactured by the Japanese music technology company Korg. It was released in April 2013 and was at the time one of the only affordable analogue synthesizers on the market. The synthesizer is 3-note paraphonic, meaning that it can play chords with all voices sharing the single voltage-controlled filter (VCF). 

The Keys is part of Korg's Volca line of compact hardware synthesizers and drum machines; like other models it features a 16-step sequencer and can be powered off of batteries.

Release 
The Volca Keys was announced in April 2013 at MusikMesse along with its siblings, the Volca Beats and Volca Bass, and proved a success for Korg. 
At the time of its release it filled in the niche of an affordable analogue synthesizer, which contributed to its success. It received high praises from reviewers for its inexpensive price and quality of sounds. On the topic, MusicTech stated, "Korg has listened to its customers and managed to hit the perfect balance of price and features" and Future Music seemed to agree, saying that "The Volcas are revolutionary at this price point". Its reach was far enough to appear as a prop in a trailer for Marvel's Disney+ series Loki.

Design 

The Volca Keys has a gold faceplate and transparent enclosure. It is lightweight and is a small size. The knobs on the front are made of transparent and solid plastic and are similar to those on the Korg Monotron, although the build quality is improved. Connections of the Volca Keys include MIDI in, sync in/out and 9V DC power input. The synthesizer can also be run off of batteries. 

The keyboard is a touchplate with no velocity sensitivity. It houses a 16-step sequencer with motion sequencing, Korg's proprietary version of parameter automation. The only way to record into the sequencer is using the real-time recording mode. You can record un-quantized with Flux mode and use Active Step for mutes and shortened patterns. The sequencer is polyphonic and includes a metronome for help with timing.

Sound engine 
The Volca Keys has analogue circuitry but all control signals are digital, allowing parameter control over MIDI. According to Korg, "[the] CPU [controlling the Volca Keys] has a 10-bit DAC giving incredible near-analogue resolution". The audio signal path, however, is completely analogue (apart from the delay):

Oscillators 
The Volca Keys' oscillators are digitally controlled analogue oscillators that are either sawtooth or square waveforms depending on the mode (square in ring modes, sawtooth in all others). The section has 5 controls: for Mode, Pitch, Detune, Portamento and EG Int (Envelope Intensity).  

The Mode controls the polyphony of the Volca Keys. Monophonic modes are Unison, Octaves, Fifth and Unison Ring (Ring being a ring modulator); paraphonic modes are Poly and Poly Ring. Korg mislabels the synthesizer as polyphonic although all oscillators share the filter. The large Pitch knob controls the pitch register of the oscillators, using organ footage terminology. It spans six octaves and is switchable between 32′, 16′, 8′, 4′, 2′ and 1′.  While in unison modes, the Detune control detunes the notes from the unison pitch up to a semitone, making the sound feel thicker. The Portamento control adds glide time between notes. Modulation can be applied to the oscillator pitch from the envelope generator using the EG Int control.

Filter 

The filter of the Volca Keys is a digitally controlled analogue low-pass filter, a recreation of the filter from Korg's MiniKorg-700S, released in the 1970s. The filter section has three control knobs: Cutoff, Peak and EG Int. Cutoff controls the cutoff point of the filter, which is also able to be controlled by the envelope generator by the EG Int control. Peak is Korg's name for filter resonance, and the Peak knob controls the amount of resonance on the filter cutoff point. The filter can be pushed into self-oscillation.

Modulation 
Modulation on the Volca Keys comes from two sources, the envelope generator and the low frequency oscillator (LFO). The envelope has control over the attack, decay/release and sustain. It is routed to the amplitude by default, but can be used to modulate the pitch and filter cutoff using the EG Int controls. The LFO has three waveforms: Saw, Triangle and Square. There are controls over the Rate of the LFO and its depth of modulation to oscillator pitch and filter cutoff. The LFO is also syncable to the start of a note.

Delay 
The Volca Keys features an delay circuit, which some have likened to that of Korg's Monotron Delay. It is low-fidelity, with low sample rates for the audio processing. The delay only has two controls, Time and Feedback. Time controls the distance between each delay echo, while Feedback controls the noise of the delays. There is no mix control on the delay circuit.

See also 
Volca Modular - another Volca, inspired by "West Coast" style synthesizers.

References

External links 
https://www.korg-volca.com/en/ - Official Korg Volca website

https://www.korg.com/uk/products/dj/volca_keys/ - Volca Keys product page
Korg synthesizers
Synthesizers
Electronic musical instruments